U-45 may refer to one of the following German submarines:

 , was a Type U 43 submarine launched in 1915 and that served in the First World War until sunk on 12 September 1917
 During the First World War, Germany also had these submarines with similar names:
 , a Type UB II submarine launched in 1916 and sunk on 6 November 1916
 , a Type UC II submarine launched in 1916 and sunk on 17 September 1917; raised on 11 April 1918; re-entered service on 24 October 1918; surrendered on 24 November 1918
 , a Type VIIB submarine that served in the Second World War until sunk on 14 October 1939.

Media

Submarines of Germany